Long Blockchain Corp. (formerly Long Island Iced Tea Corp.) is an American corporation based in Farmingdale, Long Island, New York. Its wholly owned subsidiary Long Island Brand Beverages, LLC produces ready-to-drink iced tea and lemonade under the "Long Island" brand. The company's first product was made available in 2011.

In 2017 the corporation rebranded as Long Blockchain Corp. as part of a corporate shift towards "exploration of and investment in opportunities that leverage the benefits of blockchain technology" and reported they were exploring blockchain-related acquisitions.

On April 10, 2018, Long Blockchain received a letter stating that its stock would be delisted by the NASDAQ stock exchange. Its shares would subsequently be eligible for trades over the counter. The company had by that time abandoned its plans to purchase Bitcoin mining equipment. Following the company's removal from NASDAQ, it traded over the counter.

The SEC subpoenaed documents from the firm on July 10, 2018 in a move widely believed to be related to the name change. The FBI has looked for evidence "of insider trading and securities fraud connected to Long Island Iced Tea stock." The firm stated that they were fully cooperating with the investigation.

On February 22, 2021, the SEC delisted Long Blockchain Corp's shares, saying that the company had not filed financial reports since September 30, 2018, and that it never completed its planned transition to producing blockchain technology.

In July 2021 SEC announced charges of insider trading against three major Long Blockchain investors who allegedly bought substantial numbers of shares which they sold after the stock gained as much as 380%.  They allegedly had advance notice of the name change which preceded and caused the stock rise.

References

External links
 
 Long Island Iced Tea website

Companies based in Nassau County, New York
American companies established in 2011
Iced tea brands
Oyster Bay (town), New York
Food and drink companies established in 2011
2011 establishments in New York (state)
Blockchain entities